The Minister Plenipotentiary of Sint Maarten represents the constituent country of Sint Maarten in the Council of Ministers of the Kingdom of the Netherlands. The current Minister Plenipotentiary is Rene Violenus.

A significant difference between the Netherlands Ministers and the Ministers Plenipotentiary is that the former Ministers are accountable for their politics and policies to the Dutch parliament. The Ministers Plenipotentiary, however, are accountable to their national governments. Therefore, the Ministers Plenipotentiary usually do not resign in the event of a Dutch cabinet crisis.

List of Ministers Plenipotentiary of Sint Maarten
The following table lists the Ministers Plenipotentiary of Sint Maarten that have been in office since Sint Maarten became a country in the Kingdom of the Netherlands in 2010:

References

Government of Sint Maarten